Alcidodes notabilis, is a species of weevil found in Sri Lanka.

References 

Curculionidae
Insects of Sri Lanka
Beetles described in 1961